The WS postcode area, also known as the Walsall postcode area, is a group of fifteen postcode districts in England, within six post towns. These cover the northern part of the West Midlands (including Walsall and Wednesbury) and much of south-east Staffordshire (including Lichfield, Cannock, Burntwood and Rugeley).



Coverage
The approximate coverage of the postcode districts:

|-
! WS1
| WALSALL
| Walsall town centre, Caldmore
| Walsall
|-
! WS2
| WALSALL
| Pleck, Bentley, Leamore
| Walsall
|-
! WS3
| WALSALL
| Bloxwich, Coal Pool, Pelsall
| Walsall
|-
! WS4
| WALSALL
| Rushall
| Walsall
|-
! WS5
| WALSALL
| Bescot, Tamebridge, Yew Tree
| Walsall
|-
! WS6
| WALSALL
| Cheslyn Hay, Great Wyrley
| South Staffordshire
|-
! WS7
| BURNTWOOD
| Burntwood
| Lichfield
|-
! WS8
| WALSALL
| Brownhills, Walsall Wood (north)
| Walsall
|-
! WS9
| WALSALL
| Aldridge, Walsall Wood (south), Stonnall
| Walsall, Lichfield
|-
! WS10
| WEDNESBURY
| Wednesbury, Darlaston
| Sandwell, Walsall
|-
! WS11
| CANNOCK
| Cannock, Norton Canes, Hatherton
| Cannock Chase, South Staffordshire
|-
! WS12
| CANNOCK
| Hednesford, Heath Hayes, Wimblebury, Huntington
| Cannock Chase, South Staffordshire
|-
! WS13
| LICHFIELD
| Lichfield (north and city centre), Fradley, Streethay, Croxall, Farewell, Chorley
| Lichfield
|-
! WS14
| LICHFIELD
| Lichfield (south), Shenstone, Whittington, Wall, Weeford
| Lichfield
|-
! WS15
| RUGELEY
| Rugeley, Brereton, Armitage, Handsacre, Abbots Bromley, Longdon, Mavesyn Ridware, Hill Ridware, Blithbury, Colton, Cannock Wood, Gentleshaw, Hamstall Ridware, Admaston
| Cannock Chase, Lichfield, East Staffordshire
|}

Map

See also
Postcode Address File
List of postcode areas in the United Kingdom

References

External links
Royal Mail's Postcode Address File
A quick introduction to Royal Mail's Postcode Address File (PAF)

Walsall
Postcode areas covering the West Midlands (region)